Moreira de Cónegos is a Portuguese freguesia ("civil parish") and town in the municipality of Guimarães which is in the Braga District in northern Portugal. The population in 2021 was 4,652, in an area of 4.72 km².

Sports

The town is known for its football club of Moreirense who currently play in Portugal's top division of professional football which is the Primeira Liga.

References

External links
Moreira de Cónegos - Home page
Map of Moreira de Cónegos

Freguesias of Guimarães
Towns in Portugal